Cadmium acetate is the chemical compound with the formula .  The compound is marketed both as the anhydrous form and as a dihydrate, both of which are white or colorless. Only the dihydrate has been verified by X-ray crystallography.

Preparation, reactions, and uses
It forms by treating cadmium oxide with acetic acid:

It can also be prepared by treating cadmium nitrate with acetic anhydride.

Cadmium acetate has few applications.  By reaction with trioctylphosphine selenide, it has often been used as a precursor to cadmium selenide and related semiconductors.

Structure of the dihydrate

It is a coordination polymer, featuring acetate ligands interconnecting cadmium centers.

Safety
Cadmium compounds are considered Group 1 carcinogens by the IARC.

References

Cadmium compounds
Acetates
Coordination polymers